Melica picta is a species of grass in the family Poaceae that can be found in Europe, northwestern Africa and southwestern Asia.

Description
The leaf-blades are pilose and rough. They are also hairy and have scabrous margins and surface with acuminate apex. Branches have fertile spikelets which are pediceled and are solitary as well.

They also have fertile florets which are diminished at the apex. Both are also keelless and 5-veined with obtuse apex. It is also shiny and keelless but have 3 veines. Flowers are fleshy, oblong, truncate and grow side by side, with 3 anthers.

Ecology
Melica picta is rare in hardwood and fir forests and is also uncommon on clay and loamy soils. Flowers bloom from May to June.

References

picta
Flora of Asia
Flora of Europe